Choe Jeong-hui (1912–1990) was one of the most successful early women writers in South Korea.

Life 
She was born in Dancheon, South Hamgyong Province and was educated in Seoul. She worked at a kindergarten in Tokyo and as a journalist in Seoul before starting her writing career in 1931; she worked for the magazine Samcheolli (삼천리) and the newspaper The Chosun Ilbo (조선일보). She was associated with the Korean Artists' Proletarian Federation, and was jailed in 1934 as a result.

Her daughters, Kim Ji-won and Kim Chae-won, were also successful writers. She first married filmmaker Kim Yu-yeong in 1930, but they divorced a year later when she met her second husband, Kim Dong-hwan, in 1931 while working for Samcheolli.

Selected works 
 Earthly Ties (지맥), novella 
 Human Ties (인맥), novella
 Heavenly Ties (천맥), novella

References 

1912 births
1990 deaths
South Korean journalists
South Korean women novelists
South Korean women journalists
South Korean novelists
People from South Hamgyong
People from Seoul
20th-century journalists